Wallyson Ricardo Maciel Monteiro (born 17 October 1988 in Macaíba), simply known as Wallyson, is a Brazilian footballer who plays as a forward for ABC.

Career

ABC
Wallyson began his career at ABC, and quickly became the idol of his home crowd when, being only 19 years old, scored four goals in the Campeonato Potiguar final of 2007, against the team's biggest rival in Brazilian football, América, winning by 5–2. ABC won its 49th state league championship in its history and the player himself finished the tournament as top scorer that season.
Wallyson was also a major contributor to ABC's promotion to Serie B (Brazil's national second division) making the tie-breaking goal in the last match of ABC in the competition against Bragantino, which ensured the team promotion. He was considered one of the main highlights of the Serie C. Due to his success, he was linked to Atlético Paranaense.

Atlético Paranaense
In 2008, he was traded to Atletico Paranaense. In this year, Wallyson made his debut in Serie A, however, he suffered with several injuries and failed to have a major impact in his first season with his new club. But in 2009, he won the Campeonato Paranaense, being elected the breakthrough player of this competition.

Cruzeiro
On July 29, 2010 the player was presented to Cruzeiro. He was signed from a proxy club Deportivo Maldonado on loan until 2013. Cruzeiro would receive 30% transfer fee if Wallyson was successfully sold. The team debut took place on August 22, in a loss to Vitória in a game for the Serie A. On 15 September he scored his first goal for the team in a victory over the Guarani, for 4–2. He played mostly as a substitute in his first year at Cruzeiro. In 2011, Wallyson was promoted to the first team, and finished as Cruzeiro's top scorer at Copa Santander Libertadores, with 7 goals. He scored two goals in the two final matches of the Campeonato Mineiro against biggest rivals Atlético Mineiro, which was his third State League title in career.

São Paulo
On January 11, 2013, São Paulo confirmed Wallyson had signed and was to join the squad. The player signed contract until December. In May 2013, however, after the elimination of Tricolor in State League and Libertadores Cup, the player was released, by president Juvenal Juvêncio and coach Ney Franco.

Botafogo
On January 22, 2014, Wallyson was signed by Botafogo. He remained at the club until the end of the season.

Coritiba
On March 6, 2015, Wallyson joined Coritiba.

CRB
On 1 February 2019, Wallyson signed for Clube de Regatas Brasil.

ABC
At the end of May 2019, he returned to ABC.

Honours
ABC
Campeonato Potiguar: 2007

Atlético Paranaense
Campeonato Paranaense: 2009

Cruzeiro
Campeonato Mineiro: 2011

Individual
Campeonato Potiguar Top Scorer: 2007
Campeonato Paranaense Breakthrough Player: 2009
Copa Santander Libertadores Top Scorer: 2011

References

External links

globoesporte 

1988 births
Living people
Brazilian footballers
Campeonato Brasileiro Série A players
ABC Futebol Clube players
Club Athletico Paranaense players
Cruzeiro Esporte Clube players
São Paulo FC players
Esporte Clube Bahia players
Botafogo de Futebol e Regatas players
Coritiba Foot Ball Club players
Santa Cruz Futebol Clube players
Vila Nova Futebol Clube players
Esporte Clube Vitória players
Clube de Regatas Brasil players
Association football forwards